Parijatham or Paarijatham may refer to:

 Parijatham (1950 film), a 1950 Tamil film
 Paarijatham (1976 film), a 1976 Malayalam film
 Parijatham (2006 film), a 2006 Tamil film
 Parijatham (2011 TV series), a 2011 Tamil TV series
 Paarijatham (2008 TV series), a 2008 Malayalam TV series

See also 
 Parijata, the night-flowering jasmine in Hindu mythology
 Parijat (disambiguation)